

F
Yvonne Fair
"It Should Have Been Me" (1975)
Percy Faith
"Hava Nagilah" (1975), "Summer Place '76" (1976)
Faith, Hope & Charity
"To Each His Own" (1975), "Don't Pity Me" (1978), "I'm Ready For A New Love" (1978)
Joe Farrell
"Promise Me Your Love" (1977), "Night Dancing" (1978), "Another Star" (1978)
Fat Larry's Band
"Center City" (1977), "Fascination" (1977), "Lookin' for Love" (1979), "Let the Sun Shine" (1979), "Last Chance to Dance" (1979)
Fatback Band
"Do the Bus stop" (1977), "Spanish Hustle" (1976), "Disco-Crazy" (1977), "NYCNYUSA" (1978), "Mile-High" (1978), "Do the Boogie Woogie" (1979), You're My Candy Sweet" (1979)
Wilton Felder
"Let's Dance Together" (1978)
Maynard Ferguson
"Pagliacci" (1976), "Scheherazade" (1977), "Gonna Fly Now" (1977), "Rocky II Disco" (1979)
Ferrante & Teicher
Classical Disco (1979)
The Fiestas
"Tina, the Disco Queen" (1977)
First Choice
"Armed and Extremely Dangerous" (1973), "The Player" (1974), "Dr. Love" (1977), "Let No Man Put Asunder" (1977), "Hold Your Horses" (1979)
Roberta Flack
"Feel Like Makin' Love" (1977), ""Back Together Again" (1979), "Don't Make Me Wait Too Long" (1979)
The Floaters
"I Just Wanna Be with You" (1978)
Flower (Cheryl Saban) 
"Give The Little Girl A Chance" 1978, "How" (1979), "Classical Love" (1979), "Our Never Ending Love" (1979), "Midnight Dancing" (1979)
Four Tops
"Catfish" (1976), "The Show Must Go On" (1977)
Foxy
"The Way You Do the Things You Do" (1976), "People Fall in Love (While Dancing)" (1977), "Teena's Song" (1978), "Get Off" (1978), "Ready For Love" (1978), "Hot Number" (1979), "Devil Boogie" (1979), "Headhunter" (1979)
Aretha Franklin
"No One Could Ever Love You More" (1977), "Ladies Only" (1979), "Only Star" (1979)
Frantique
"Strut Your Funky Stuff" (1979), "Disco Dancer" (1979)
Funkadelic
"One Nation Under A Groove" (1978), "(Not Just) Knee Deep" (1979)

G
Juan Gabriel
"Nadie Baila Como Tu" (1978), "Me Gusta Bailar Contigo" (1978), "Everybody Dance In Acapulco" (1978), "El Noa Noa" (1980), "El Noa Noa II" (1984)
Patsy Gallant
"From New York to L.A." (1976), "Sugar Daddy" (1977)
Gap Band
"Baby Baba Boogie" (1979), "Oops Upside Your Head" (1980), "Burn Rubber" (1981), "Outstanding" (1982), "You Dropped A Bomb On Me" (1982)
Taana Gardner
"When You Touch Me" (1979), "Work That Body" (1979), "Heartbeat" (1980)
Leif Garrett
"I Was Made for Dancin'" (1978), "Give In" (1979), "Moonlight Dancing" (1979), "New York City Nights" (1980)
Gary's Gang
"Keep On Dancin'" (1978), "Let's Lovedance Tonight" (1979), "Knock Me Out" (1982)
Gary Toms Empire
"7-6-5-4-3-2-1" (1975)
Pearly Gates
"Fandango Dancing" (1979)
Marvin Gaye
"Got to Give It Up" (1977), "Ego Trippin' Out" (1978), "Love Party" (1979)
Gloria Gaynor 
"Honey Bee" (1974), "Never Can Say Goodbye" (1974), "Reach Out (I'll Be There)" (1974), "Casanova Brown" (1975), "Most of All" (1977), "Anybody Wanna Party" (1978), "Substitute" (1978), "I Will Survive" (1978), "Let Me Know (I Have a Right)" (1979), "Tonight" (1980), "I Am What I Am" (1983)
Andy Gibb
"I Just Want to Be Your Everything" (1977), "Shadow Dancing" (1978), “An Everlasting Love” (1978), “Desire” (1980)
Gibson Brothers
"Symphony" (1977), "Que Sera Mi Vida (If You Should Go)" (1978), "Jenny" (1978), "Ooh What a Night" (1979), "Cuba" (1979), "Mariana" (1980)
James Gilstrap
"Swing Your Daddy" (1975), "Love Talk" (1976)
Gladys Knight & the Pips
"Baby Don't Change Your Mind" (1977), "Bourgié Bourgié" (1980)
GQ
"Disco Nights (Rock-Freak)" (1979)
Lourett Russell Grant
"Hot to Trot" (1979)
Al Green
"Full of Fire" (1975), "Love and Happiness" (1977)
Dave Grusin
"Disco Magic" (1979)
Robert Guillaume
"I Who Have Nothing" (1979), "The Streets Are Filled with Dancing" (1979)

H
Marvin Hamlisch
"Bond '77 (James Bond Theme)" (1977)
Herbie Hancock
"Cameleon" (1973), "Rock It" (1983)
Harold Melvin & the Blue Notes
"The Love I Lost" (1973), "Bad Luck" (1975), "Wake Up Everybody" (1975), "Where Are All My Friends" (1975), "Don't Leave Me This Way" (1975), "Prayin'" (1979)
Damon Harris
"Silk" (1978)
Major Harris
"Each Morning I Wake Up" (1975)
Dan Hartman
"Countdown"/"This Is It" (1978), "Instant Replay" (1978), "Relight My Fire" (1979), "Free Ride" (1979), "I Can Dream About You" (1983)
Isaac Hayes
"Juicy Fruit (Disco Freak)" (1976), "Stranger in Paradise" (1977), "Moonlight Lovin' (Ménage à trois)" (1977), "Shaft II" (1978), "Don't Let Go" (1979)
Heatwave
"Boogie Nights" (1977), "The Groove Line" (1978)
Wayne Henderson
"Dancin' Love Affair" (1978), "Heat of the Beat" (1979)
Herman Kelly and Life
"Dance to the Drummer's Beat" (1978)
Patrick Hernandez
"Born to Be Alive" (1979), "Disco Queen" (1979)
Martha High
"He's My Ding-Dong Man" (1979)
High Inergy
"Shoulda Gone Dancing" (1979)
Lawrence Hilton-Jacobs
"Fly Away" (1978)
Marcia Hines
"Dance, You Fool, Dance" (1979)
Loleatta Holloway
"Dreamin'" (1976), "Hit and Run" (1976), "Gettin' Stronger (The Longer We Stay Together)" (1976), "Ripped Off" (1976), "Run Away" (with The Salsoul Orchestra) (1977), "Catch Me on the Rebound" (1978), "I May Not Be There When You Need Me" (1978), "All About The Paper" (1979), "That's What You Said" (1979), "Love Sensation" (1980)
Jimmy "Bo" Horne
"Get Happy" (1977), "Dance Across The Floor" (1978), "Spank" (1978), "Is It In" (1979)
Hot Chocolate
"Disco Queen" (1974), "You Sexy Thing" (1975), "Don't Stop It Now" (1976), "Heaven's In The Backseat Of My Cadillac" (1977), "So You Win Again" (1977), "Every One's A Winner" (1978) "Are You Getting Enough Of What Makes You Happy" (1980), "Girl Crazy" (1982)
Cissy Houston
"Think It Over" (1978), "Warning - Danger" (1979)
Thelma Houston
"Don't Leave Me This Way" (1977), "Saturday Night, Sunday Morning" (1979), "Love Machine" (1979)
Frankie Howerd
”Mean Mr. Mustard” (1978)
The Hues Corporation
"Rock the Boat" (1974), "Rockn Soul" (1974), "I Caught Your Act" (1976)
Geraldine Hunt
"Hot-Blooded Woman" (1978), "Hang on to Love" (1978), "Can't Fake the Feeling" (1980)
Leroy Hutson
"Unforgettable" (1979)
Phyllis Hyman
"Loving You" (1977), "Kiss You All Over" (1978), "So Strange" (1978), "You Know How to Love Me" (1979), "Under Your Spell" (1979)

I
The Impressions
"Dance" (1977)
Inner Life
"I'm Caught Up (In a One Night Love Affair)" (1979)
Instant Funk
"I Got My Mind Made Up" (1978), "Crying" (1979)
The Isley Brothers
"People of Today" (1976), "Who Loves You Better" (1976), "I Wanna Be With You" (1979), "Winner Takes All" (1979), "Life In The City" (1979), "It's a Disco Night (Rock Don't Stop)" (1979)

J
Paul Jabara
"Heaven Is a Disco" (1978), "Disco Queen" (1978), "Disco Wedding/Disco Honeymoon" (1979)
Dee D. Jackson 
"Man Of A Man" (1977), "Automatic Lover" (1978), "Meteor Man" (1978), "Fireball" (1979)
Jermaine Jackson
"Let's Be Young Tonight" (1976), "Let's Get Serious" (1979)
Michael Jackson
"Ease on Down the Road" (with Diana Ross) (1978), "You Can't Win" (1978), "Don't Stop 'Til You Get Enough" (1979), "Rock With You" (1979), "Off The Wall" (1979), "Get On The Floor" (1979), "Working Day and Night" (1979), "Burn This Disco Out" (1979)
Mick Jackson
"Weekend" (1978), "Blame It on the Boogie" (1978)
Millie Jackson
"All-the-Way Love" (1978), "We Got to Hit It Off" (1979), "What Went Wrong Last Night" (1979)
Walter Jackson
"Good to See You" (1978), "Give It Up" (1979)
The Jackson 5
"Dancing Machine" (1974), **"The Life of The Party" (1974), "Forever Came Today" (1975)
The Jacksons
"Enjoy Yourself" (1976), "Show You The Way To Go" (1976), "Keep On Dancing" (1976), "Goin' Places" (1977), "Blame It On The Boogie" (1978), "Shake Your Body (Down To The Ground)" (1978), "Lovely One" (1980)
Jimmy James(Jamaica, UK)
"Now Is the Time" (1976)
Rick James
"You and I" (1978), "Sexy Lady" (1978), "Mary Jane" (1979), "17" (1979), "Super Freak" (1981), "Give It To Me Baby" (1981), "Dance Wit' Me" (1982), "Cold Blooded" (1983), "Glow" (1985)
James & Bobby Purify
"Do Your Thing" (1974),
Jean-Michel Jarre
"Zoolook" (1984)
Jamiroquai
"Cosmic Girl" (1996), "Canned Heat" (1999), "Love Foolosophy" (2002), "Runaway" (2006)
Morris Jefferson
"Spank Your Blank Blank" (1977), "Get on up and Dance" (1979)
Jennifer
"Do It For Me" (1976)
Jimmy Castor Bunch
"Bertha Butt Boogie" (1975), "KingKong" (1975)
Elton John
"Philadelphia Freedom" (1975), "I Don't Want To Go On With You Like That (Shep Pettibone Remix)" (1989)
Robert John
"Give a Little Bit" (1978), "Sad Eyes" (1979), "Greased Lightning" (1984)
John Davis and the Monster Orchestra
"Up Jumped the Devil" (1977), "Ain't That Enough for You" (1978), "Love Magic" (1979), "That's What I Get" (1979)
Beverly Johnson
"Don't Run for Cover" (1979)
General Johnson
"Let's Fool Around" (1977), "Can't Nobody Love Me Like You Do" (1978)
Sylvester Johnson
"Mystery Lady" (1979)
France Joli
"Come To Me" (1979), "Don't Stop Dancing" (1979), "Let Go" (1979), "Playboy" (1979), "The Heart To Break The Heart" (1980), "Gonna Get Over You" (1982), "I Need Someone" (1982), "Your Good Lovin'" (1982), "Girl In The 80's" (1984)
Gloria Jones
"Bring on the Love" (1977), "Woman Is Woman" (1977), "When I Was a Little Girl" (1979)
Grace Jones
"Sorry" (1976), "That's The Trouble" (1976), "La Vie En Rose" (1977), "I Need A Man" (1978), "Do Or Die" (1978), "Sinning" (1979), "Saved" (1979), "Am I Ever Gonna Fall In Love" (1979),  "Pull Up To The Bumper" (1981), "Slave To The Rhythm" (1985), 
Jack Jones
"Theme from The Love Boat" (1979)
Quincy Jones
"Love, I Never Had It So Good" (1978), "Stuff Like That" (1978), "Ai No Corida" (1981), "Razzmatazz" (1981)
Ronnie Jones
"Soul Sister" (1978), "The Two of Us" [duet with Claudja Barry] (1978), "Fox on the Run" (1979)
Tamiko Jones
"Can’t Live Without Your Love" (1979)
Tom Jones
"Don't Cry for Me Argentina" (1979)
Patrick Juvet
"Ou Sont les Femmes" (1977), "I Love America" (1978), "Lady Night" (1979), "Swiss Kiss" (1979)

K
Madleen Kane
"Rough Diamond" (1978), "Touch My Heart" (1978), "Let's Make Love" (1978), "Forbidden Love" (1979)
Kat Mandu a.k.a. Lime
"The Break" (1979), "I Wanna Dance" (1981), "Hooked On Voices" (1987)
KC & the Sunshine Band
"Sound Your Funky Horn" (1974),  "Get Down Tonight" (1975), "That's The Way (I Like It)" (1975), "Boogie Shoes" (1975), "(Shake, Shake, Shake) Shake Your Booty" (1976), "I Like to Do It" (1976), "I'm Your Boogie Man" (1976), "Keep It Comin' Love" (1976), "It's The Same Old Song" (1978), "Do You Wanna Go Party" (1979), "Give It Up" (1983)
Roberta Kelly
"Trouble-Maker" (1976), "I'm Sagittarius" (1977), "Love-Sign" (1977), "Sunburst" (1977), "Zodiacs Medley" (1978)
Eddie Kendricks
"Keep On Truckin'" (1973), "Boogie Down" (1974)
Chaka Khan
"I'm Every Woman" (1978), "Life Is a Dance" (1978), "What Cha Gonna Do for Me" (1981), "Fate" (1981), "I Feel For You" (1984)
Andy Kim
”Rock Me Gently” (1974)
Ben E. King
"Supernatural Thing" (1975), "A Star in the Ghetto" (with Average White Band) (1977), "Music Trance" (1979)
Carole King
"Disco Tech" (1978)
Evelyn "Champagne" King
"Shame" (1977), "I Don't Know If It's Right" (1977), "I'm In Love" (1981), "Love Come Down" (1982)
Fern Kinney
"Groove Me" (1979), "Pillow Talk" (1979), "Together We Are Beautiful" (1980)
Kinsman Dazz a.k.a. Dazz Band
"Keep on Rockin'" (1979), "Let It Whip" (1982)
Kiss
"I Was Made For Lovin' You" (1979)
Eartha Kitt
"Where Is My Man" (1983), "I Love Men" (1984), "This Is My Life" (1986), "I Don't Care" (1986), "Arabian Song" (1987), "Sugar Daddy" (1987), "Cha Cha Heels" (With Bronski Beat) (1987)
Kleeer
"Keep Your Body Working" (1978), "Tonight's the Night" (1978), "Winners" (1979), "It's Magic" (1979)
Gladys Knight
"Love Is Always On Your Mind" (1977), "It's a Better-Than-Good Time" (1978), "You Bring Out the Best in Me" (1979)
Kool & the Gang
"Funky Stuff" (1973), "More Funky Stuff" (1973), "Jungle Boogie" (1973), "Hollywood Swingin'" (1976), "Spirit of the Boogie" (1975), "Open Sesame" (1976), "Ladies Night" (1979), "Tonight's The Night" (1976), "Celebration" (1980), "Night People" (1980), "Get Down On It" (1981),  "Steppin' Out" (1981)
Koxo
"Step By Step" (1982)

References